Bibliographic Index was a metabibliography and bibliographic database published by the H. W. Wilson Company. It contained in-depth indexing of more than 530,000 bibliographies published in English, German, Dutch, and the Scandinavian, Slavic, and Romance languages, including over 185,000 full-text bibliographies.

In 2004, Bibliographic Index became Bibliographic Index Plus. After EBSCO acquired the H. W. Wilson Company in 2011, the database was discontinued.

References

Publications established in 1937
Publications disestablished in 2011
Bibliographic databases and indexes